Ryk Neethling OIS (born 17 November 1977) is a South African businessman who rose to prominence as the three-times World Champion and four-times World Record Breaking Olympic swimming champion.

He is known as one of the most accomplished swimmers in history.

He is CEO of the Princess Charlene of Monaco Foundation South Africa, a Laureus Sport for Good Foundation Ambassador, founder of the Ryk Neethling Swimming Schools and a director and shareholder of Val de Vie Estate. He is also an international keynote and motivational speaker.

He won an Olympic gold medal in the 4×100 m freestyle relay at the 2004 Summer Olympics and won three individual gold medals at the 2006 FINA World Aquatics Championships in Shanghai. 
 
Winning nine National Collegiate Athletic Association championships makes him the third best men's swimmer in almost 100 years.

He is the former joint owner of the 4×100 m freestyle relay world record and broke the 100m Individual Medley World Record three times in 2005.
 
He is also the first South African to compete in four successive Olympic Games.

He holds a Bachelor of Arts degree in Psychology and Business from the University of Arizona, which also named him the American NCAA Swimmer of the Year and Athlete of the Century in 1999.

Biography
Born in Bloemfontein, he attended Grey College, where he excelled in swimming, earning a place in the South African swimming team for the 1996 Summer Olympics in Atlanta, where he came fifth in the 1500 m freestyle.

Immediately following the Games he was enrolled at The University of Arizona in the United States, where he further cemented his swimming reputation, earning a numerous awards and accolades, including being the 9 times NCAA National Champion, Arizona Athlete of the Year and PAC-10 Athlete of the Year for four consecutive years, 1999 NCAA Swimmer of the Year, and the University of Arizona Athlete of the Century award.

He continued his international career at the 1998 Commonwealth Games, winning the silver medal in the 1500 m freestyle, but only managing fifth at the 1998 World Aquatics Championships. In 1999 he had a much better Pan Pacific Championships winning silver in the 1500 m freestyle, and bronze in the 400 m and 200 m freestyle. After achieving a disappointing 5th in the 1500 m freestyle event and 8th in the 400 m freestyle at the 2000 Summer Olympics in Sydney he elected to discontinue competing in the 1500 m event, concentrating instead on the 50 m and 100 m freestyle events. He is the only men's swimmer in Olympic history to swim in the 100 to 1500m freestyle finals At the 2002 Commonwealth Games he won a bronze medal in the 100 m freestyle and came 4th in the 50 m freestyle events. At the 2006 Commonwealth Games he won silver in the 100 m freestyle and was part of the S.A gold medal winning 4×100 m freestyle relay team.

He currently holds the South African record in the 200 m, 400 m, 800 m and 1500 m freestyle events, and recently held 4×100 m freestyle relay world record. He also broke three world records in the 100m individual medley.

The highlight of his career thus far has been winning a gold medal in the 4×100 m freestyle relay at the 2004 Summer Olympics. He also placed 4th in the individual 100 m freestyle.

In November 2005, he announced that he had refused a multimillion-dollar offer by Qatar's Olympic body to switch nationalities and swim for Qatar at the 2008 Beijing Olympics.

The 4×100 m freestyle relay world record was subsequently broken in 2006 by the United States.

After finishing the 2008 Summer Olympics. He became the first South African to participate four successive Olympic Games.

He is now shareholder and marketing director of Val de Vie Estate a luxury property development in Paarl, South Africa.

See also
 List of Commonwealth Games medallists in swimming (men)
 List of Olympic medalists in swimming (men)
 World record progression 4 × 100 metres freestyle relay

References

External links
 Official website
 
 
 
 

1977 births
Living people
Afrikaner people
South African people of Dutch descent
South African male swimmers
Sportspeople from Bloemfontein
Olympic swimmers of South Africa
Olympic gold medalists for South Africa
Swimmers at the 1996 Summer Olympics
Swimmers at the 2000 Summer Olympics
Swimmers at the 2004 Summer Olympics
Swimmers at the 2008 Summer Olympics
Swimmers at the 2006 Commonwealth Games
Swimmers at the 2002 Commonwealth Games
Swimmers at the 1998 Commonwealth Games
Commonwealth Games gold medallists for South Africa
Commonwealth Games silver medallists for South Africa
Commonwealth Games bronze medallists for South Africa
Arizona Wildcats men's swimmers
Alumni of Grey College, Bloemfontein
World record setters in swimming
South African male freestyle swimmers
World Aquatics Championships medalists in swimming
Medalists at the FINA World Swimming Championships (25 m)
Medalists at the 2004 Summer Olympics
Recipients of the Order of Ikhamanga
Olympic gold medalists in swimming
Commonwealth Games medallists in swimming
Goodwill Games medalists in swimming
Competitors at the 1998 Goodwill Games
Medallists at the 1998 Commonwealth Games
Medallists at the 2002 Commonwealth Games
Medallists at the 2006 Commonwealth Games